The 2014–15 network television schedule for the five major English-language commercial broadcast networks in the United States covers prime time hours from September 2014 to August 2015. The schedule is followed by a list per network of returning series, new series, and series canceled after the 2013–14 season.

NBC was the first to announce its fall schedule on May 11, 2014, followed by Fox on May 12, 2014, ABC on May 13, 2014, CBS on May 14, 2014 and The CW on May 15, 2014.

PBS is not included; member stations have local flexibility over most of their schedules and broadcast times for network shows may vary. Ion Television and MyNetworkTV are also not included since the majority of both networks' schedules comprise syndicated reruns (with limited original programming on the former). The CW is not included on weekends, since it does not offer network programming.

New series are highlighted in bold.

All times are U.S. Eastern and Pacific time (except for some live events or specials). Subtract one hour for Central and Mountain times.

Each of the 30 highest-rated shows is listed with its rank and rating as determined by Nielsen Media Research.

Legend

Sunday

Note: NBC’s Mission Control was originally scheduled to air in 2015 as a summer entry at 8:30, but was canceled.

Monday

Tuesday

Wednesday

Thursday

Friday

Saturday

By network

ABC

Returning series:
20/20
ABC Saturday Movie of the Week
Agents of S.H.I.E.L.D.
America's Funniest Home Videos
The Bachelor
Bachelor in Paradise
The Bachelorette
BattleBots (moved from Comedy Central)
Castle
Celebrity Family Feud (moved from NBC)
Celebrity Wife Swap
Dancing with the Stars
Extreme Weight Loss
The Goldbergs
The Great Christmas Light Fight
Grey's Anatomy
Last Man Standing
The Middle
Mistresses
Modern Family
Nashville
Once Upon a Time
Resurrection
Revenge
Rookie Blue
Scandal
Shark Tank
The Taste
What Would You Do?

New series:
20/20: In an Instant *
500 Questions *
Bachelor in Paradise: After Paradise *
Agent Carter *
American Crime *
The Astronaut Wives Club *
Beyond the Tank *
Black-ish
Boston EMS *
Cristela
Forever
Fresh Off the Boat *
Galavant *
How to Get Away with Murder
Manhattan Love Story
Repeat After Me *
Save My Life: Boston Trauma *
Secrets and Lies *
Selfie
The Whispers *

Not returning from 2013–14:
The Assets
Back in the Game
Bet on Your Baby
Betrayal
Black Box
Killer Women
Lucky 7
Motive (moved to USA Network)
Mind Games
Mixology
The Neighbors
NY Med
Once Upon a Time in Wonderland
Rising Star
Suburgatory
Super Fun Night
Trophy Wife
Wipeout (revived by TBS in 2021)

CBS

Returning series:
2 Broke Girls
48 Hours
60 Minutes
The Amazing Race
The Big Bang Theory
Big Brother
Blue Bloods
Criminal Minds
CSI: Crime Scene Investigation
Elementary
Extant
The Good Wife
Hawaii Five-0
The Mentalist
Mike & Molly
The Millers
Mom
NCIS
NCIS: Los Angeles
Person of Interest
Survivor
Thursday Night Football (moved from NFL Network)
Two and a Half Men
Under the Dome
Undercover Boss

New series:
Battle Creek *
The Briefcase *
CSI: Cyber *
The Dovekeepers *
Madam Secretary
The McCarthys
NCIS: New Orleans
The Odd Couple *
Scorpion
Stalker
Zoo *

Not returning from 2013–14:
 Bad Teacher
 The Crazy Ones
 Friends with Better Lives
 Hostages
 How I Met Your Mother
 Intelligence
 Reckless
 Unforgettable (moved to A&E)
 We Are Men

The CW

Returning series:
The 100
America's Next Top Model
Arrow
Beauty & the Beast
Hart of Dixie
Masters of Illusion
The Originals
Penn & Teller: Fool Us
Reign
Supernatural
The Vampire Diaries
Whose Line Is It Anyway?

New series:
A Wicked Offer *
Cedric's Barber Battle *
Dates *
The Flash
iZombie *
Jane the Virgin
The Messengers *
Significant Mother *

Not returning from 2013–14:
Backpackers
The Carrie Diaries
Famous in 12
Nikita
Seed
Star-Crossed
The Tomorrow People

Fox

Returning series:
American Idol
Are You Smarter Than a 5th Grader?
Bob's Burgers
Bones
Brooklyn Nine-Nine
Family Guy
The Following
Fox College Football
Glee
Hell's Kitchen
MasterChef
MasterChef Junior
The Mindy Project
New Girl
NFL on Fox
The Simpsons
Sleepy Hollow
So You Think You Can Dance

New series:
Backstrom *
Boom! *
Bullseye *
Empire *
Golan the Insatiable *
Gotham
Gracepoint
Home Free *
Knock Knock Live *
The Last Man on Earth *
Mulaney
Red Band Society
Utopia
Wayward Pines *
Weird Loners *
World's Funniest *

Not returning from 2013–14:
 24: Live Another Day
Almost Human
American Dad! (moved to TBS)
Dads
Enlisted
Gang Related
I Wanna Marry "Harry"
Kitchen Nightmares
Raising Hope
Rake
Riot
Surviving Jack
The X Factor

NBC

Returning series:
About a Boy
American Ninja Warrior
America's Got Talent
The Apprentice
The Biggest Loser
The Blacklist
Chicago Fire
Chicago P.D.
Dateline NBC
Food Fighters
Football Night in America
Grimm
Hannibal
Hollywood Game Night
Law & Order: Special Victims Unit
Last Comic Standing
NBC Sunday Night Football
The Night Shift
Parenthood
Parks and Recreation
Running Wild with Bear Grylls
The Sing-Off
Undateable
The Voice
Welcome to Sweden

New series:
A.D. The Bible Continues *
A to Z
Allegiance *
American Odyssey *
Aquarius *
Bad Judge
The Carmichael Show *
Caught on Camera with Nick Cannon
Constantine
Dateline: The Real Blacklist *
I Can Do That *
The Island *
Marry Me
Mr. Robinson *
The Mysteries of Laura
One Big Happy *
The Slap *
State of Affairs

Not returning from 2013–14:
Believe
Community (moved to Yahoo! Screen)
Crisis
Crossbones
Dracula
Growing Up Fisher
Ironside
The Michael J. Fox Show
Revolution
Sean Saves the World
Taxi Brooklyn
Welcome to the Family
Working the Engels

Renewals and cancellations

Full season pickups

ABC
Black-ish—Picked up for a full 22-episode season on October 9, 2014, then an additional two episodes for a twenty-four-episode season on October 23, 2014.
Cristela—Picked up for a full 22-episode season on November 24, 2014.
Forever—Picked up for a full 22-episode season on November 7, 2014.
How to Get Away with Murder—Picked up for a 15-episode season on October 9, 2014.

CBS
Madam Secretary—Picked up for a full 22-episode season on October 27, 2014.
The McCarthys—Picked up for two additional episodes for a total of 15 episodes on December 1, 2014.
NCIS: New Orleans—Picked up for a full 23-episode season on October 27, 2014.
Scorpion—Picked up for a full 22-episode season on October 27, 2014.
Stalker—Picked up for a full 20-episode season on October 27, 2014.

The CW
The Flash—Picked up for a full 23-episode season on October 21, 2014.
Jane the Virgin—Picked up for a full 22-episode season on October 21, 2014.

Fox
Gotham—Picked up for a full 22-episode season on October 13, 2014.
Mulaney—Picked up for an additional 10 episodes on May 6, 2014, for a total of a 16-episode season. This order was later cut back by three episodes on October 18, 2014, when production was effectively shut down.

NBC
Marry Me—Picked up for five additional episodes for a total of 18 episodes on November 5, 2014.
The Mysteries of Laura—Picked up for a full 22-episode season on October 28, 2014.

Renewals

ABC
20/20—Renewed for a thirty-seventh season on May 7, 2015.
500 Questions—Renewed for a second season on October 1, 2015.
Agent Carter—Renewed for a second season on May 7, 2015.
Agents of S.H.I.E.L.D—Renewed for a third season on May 7, 2015.
America's Funniest Home Videos—Renewed for a twenty-sixth season on May 7, 2015.
American Crime—Renewed for a second season on May 7, 2015.
The Bachelor—Renewed for a twentieth season on May 7, 2015.
BattleBots—Renewed for a second season on November 6, 2015.
Beyond the Tank—Renewed for a second season on May 7, 2015.
Black-ish—Renewed for a second season on May 7, 2015.
Castle—Renewed for an eighth season on May 7, 2015.
Celebrity Family Feud—Renewed for a second season on January 9, 2016.
Dancing with the Stars—Renewed for a twenty-first season on May 7, 2015.
Fresh Off the Boat—Renewed for a second season on May 7, 2015.
Galavant—Renewed for a second season on May 7, 2015.
The Goldbergs—Renewed for a third season on May 7, 2015.
Grey's Anatomy—Renewed for a twelfth season on May 7, 2015.
How to Get Away with Murder—Renewed for a second season on May 7, 2015.
Last Man Standing—Renewed for a fifth season on May 10, 2015.
The Middle—Renewed for a seventh season on May 7, 2015.
Mistresses—Renewed for a fourth season on September 25, 2015.
Modern Family—Renewed for a seventh season on May 7, 2015.
Nashville—Renewed for a fourth season on May 7, 2015.
Once Upon a Time—Renewed for a fifth season on May 7, 2015.
Secrets & Lies—Renewed for a second season on May 7, 2015.
Scandal—Renewed for a fifth season on May 7, 2015.
Shark Tank—Renewed for a seventh season on May 7, 2015.

CBS
2 Broke Girls—Renewed for a fifth season on March 12, 2015.
48 Hours—Renewed for a twenty-eighth season on May 11, 2015.
60 Minutes—Renewed for a forty-eighth season on May 11, 2015.
The Amazing Race—Renewed for a twenty-seventh season on May 11, 2015.
The Big Bang Theory—Renewed for a ninth and tenth season on March 12, 2014.
Big Brother—Renewed for a seventeenth and eighteenth season on September 24, 2014.
Blue Bloods—Renewed for a sixth season on May 11, 2015.
Criminal Minds—Renewed for an eleventh season on May 11, 2015.
CSI: Cyber—Renewed for a second season on May 11, 2015.
Elementary—Renewed for a fourth season on May 11, 2015.
The Good Wife—Renewed for a seventh and final season on May 11, 2015.
Hawaii Five-0—Renewed for a sixth season on May 11, 2015.
Madam Secretary—Renewed for a second season on January 12, 2015.
Mike & Molly—Renewed for a sixth and final season on March 12, 2015.
Mom—Renewed for a third season on March 12, 2015.
NCIS—Renewed for a thirteenth season on May 11, 2015.
NCIS: Los Angeles—Renewed for a seventh season on May 11, 2015.
NCIS: New Orleans—Renewed for a second season on January 12, 2015.
The Odd Couple—Renewed for a second season on May 11, 2015.
Person of Interest—Renewed for a fifth and final season on May 11, 2015.
Scorpion—Renewed for a second season on January 12, 2015.
Survivor—Renewed for a thirty-first season on May 11, 2015.
Thursday Night Football—Renewed for a second season on January 18, 2015.
Undercover Boss—Renewed for a seventh season on May 11, 2015.
Zoo—Renewed for a second season on October 2, 2015.

The CW
The 100—Renewed for a third season on January 11, 2015.
America's Next Top Model—Renewed for a twenty-second cycle on November 17, 2014.
Arrow—Renewed for a fourth season on January 11, 2015.
Beauty & the Beast—Renewed for a fourth season on February 13, 2015.
The Flash—Renewed for a second season on January 11, 2015.
iZombie—Renewed for a second season on May 6, 2015.
Jane the Virgin—Renewed for a second season on January 11, 2015.
The Originals—Renewed for a third season on January 11, 2015.
Penn & Teller: Fool Us—Renewed for a third season on August 11, 2015.
Reign—Renewed for a third season on January 11, 2015.
Supernatural—Renewed for an eleventh season on January 11, 2015.
The Vampire Diaries—Renewed for a seventh season on January 11, 2015.
Whose Line Is It Anyway?—Renewed for a twelfth season on August 11, 2015.

Fox
American Idol—Renewed for a fifteenth and final season on May 11, 2015
Bob's Burgers—Renewed for a sixth season on January 8, 2015.
Bones—Renewed for an eleventh season on May 8, 2015.
Brooklyn Nine-Nine—Renewed for a third season on January 17, 2015.
Empire—Renewed for a second season on January 17, 2015.
Family Guy—Renewed for a fourteenth season on May 11, 2015.
Gotham—Renewed for a second season on January 17, 2015.
The Last Man on Earth—Renewed for a second season on April 8, 2015.
MasterChef—Renewed for a seventh season on July 22, 2015.
MasterChef Junior—Renewed for a fourth season on January 13, 2015.
New Girl—Renewed for a fifth season on March 31, 2015.
The Simpsons—Renewed for a twenty-seventh and twenty-eighth season on May 4, 2015.
Sleepy Hollow—Renewed for a third season on March 18, 2015.
Wayward Pines—Renewed for a second season on December 9, 2015.
World's Funniest Fails—Renewed for a second season on May 11, 2015.

NBC
American Ninja Warrior—Renewed for an eighth season on August 13, 2015.
America's Got Talent—Renewed for an eleventh season on September 2, 2015.
The Apprentice—Renewed for a fifteenth season on February 16, 2015.
Aquarius—Renewed for a second season on June 26, 2015.
The Biggest Loser—Renewed for a seventeenth season on May 10, 2015.
The Blacklist—Renewed for a third season on February 5, 2015.
The Carmichael Show—Renewed for a second season on September 14, 2015.
Chicago Fire—Renewed for a fourth season on February 5, 2015.
Chicago P.D.—Renewed for a third season on February 5, 2015.
Football Night in America—Renewed for a tenth season on December 14, 2011.
Grimm—Renewed for a fifth season on February 5, 2015.
Hollywood Game Night—Renewed for a fourth season on December 2, 2015.
I Can Do That—Renewed for a second season on July 2, 2015.
Law & Order: Special Victims Unit—Renewed for a seventeenth season on February 5, 2015.
The Mysteries of Laura—Renewed for a second season on May 8, 2015.
NBC Sunday Night Football—Renewed for a tenth season on December 14, 2011.
The Night Shift—Renewed for a third season on May 8, 2015.
Undateable—Renewed for a third season on May 8, 2015.
The Voice—Renewed for a ninth season on May 10, 2015.

Cancellations/series endings

ABC
The Astronaut Wives Club—Canceled on August 23, 2015.
Cristela—Canceled on May 7, 2015.
Forever—Canceled on May 7, 2015.
Manhattan Love Story—Canceled on October 24, 2014 after four low rated episodes. This was the first cancellation of the season.
Members Only—It was announced on November 23, 2014 that production would not go forward, despite being picked up straight to series in January.
Repeat After Me—Was never renewed for a second season.
Resurrection—Canceled on May 7, 2015.
Revenge—Canceled on April 29, 2015 after four seasons. The series concluded on May 10, 2015.
Rookie Blue—Canceled on October 16, 2015 after six seasons.
Selfie—Canceled on November 7, 2014 following completion of its initial thirteen episode order due to low ratings.
The Taste—Canceled on May 7, 2015.
The Whispers—Canceled on October 22, 2015.

CBS
Battle Creek—Canceled on May 8, 2015.
The Briefcase—Canceled on December 9, 2015.
Extant—Canceled on October 9, 2015.
The McCarthys—On February 3, 2015, the series was pulled from the schedule. It was later canceled on May 8, 2015. The remaining episodes aired beginning July 4, 2015.
The Mentalist—It was announced on September 27, 2014 that season seven would be the final season. The series concluded on February 18, 2015.
The Millers—Canceled on November 14, 2014. The remaining episodes aired beginning July 4, 2015.
Stalker—Canceled on May 8, 2015.
Two and a Half Men—It was announced on May 14, 2014 that season twelve would be the final season. The series concluded on February 19, 2015.
Under the Dome—Canceled on August 31, 2015 after three seasons. The series concluded on September 10, 2015.

The CW
Hart of Dixie—It was announced on March 14, 2015 that the show will end after four seasons. The series concluded on March 27, 2015, but wasn't officially canceled until May 7, 2015.
The Messengers—Canceled on May 7, 2015.

Fox
Backstrom—Canceled on May 8, 2015.
The Following—Canceled on May 8, 2015.
Glee—It was announced on October 17, 2013 that season six would be the final season. The series concluded on March 20, 2015.
Hieroglyph—It was announced on June 30, 2014 that production would not continue after filming one episode.
Knock Knock Live—Canceled on July 30, 2015 after two low rated episodes.
The Mindy Project—Canceled on May 6, 2015, after three seasons. On May 15, 2015, It was announced that Hulu would pick up the series for another season.
Mulaney—It was announced on October 18, 2014 that Fox cut the episode order by 3 episodes, effectively shutting down production. It was later canceled on February 28, 2015.
Red Band Society—On November 26, 2014, it was confirmed that the show would stop production after the 13-episode order, and the show was pulled from the schedule. It was later canceled on January 13, 2015.
Utopia—Canceled on November 2, 2014 after 12 low rated episodes. Production would not continue past that point and 24/7 live streaming was discontinued.
Weird Loners—Canceled on May 11, 2015

NBC
A to Z—Canceled on October 31, 2014 following completion of its initial thirteen episode order due to low ratings.
A.D. The Bible Continues—Canceled on July 3, 2015.
About a Boy—Canceled on May 8, 2015.
Allegiance—Canceled on March 6, 2015 after five low rated episodes.
American Odyssey—Canceled on June 30, 2015.
Bad Judge—Canceled on October 31, 2014 following completion of its initial thirteen episode order due to low ratings.
Constantine—Canceled on May 8, 2015.
Emerald City—It was announced on August 22, 2014 that production would not go forward, despite being previously ordered to a ten episode limited series, bypassing the pilot process. The decision on the series' cancellation was later reversed on April 15, 2015, to air in the following season.
Hannibal—Canceled on June 22, 2015 after three seasons. The series concluded on August 29, 2015.
Marry Me—Canceled on May 8, 2015.
Mission Control—It was announced on October 15, 2014, that the series order for six episodes was rescinded – prior to production starting on episodes beyond the pilot.
Mr. Robinson—Canceled on September 14, 2015.
One Big Happy—Canceled on May 8, 2015.
Parenthood—It was announced on May 11, 2014 that season six would be the final season. The series concluded on January 29, 2015.
Parks and Recreation—It was announced on May 11, 2014 that season seven would be the final season. The series concluded on February 24, 2015.
State of Affairs—Canceled on May 8, 2015.
Unbreakable Kimmy Schmidt—It was announced on November 21, 2014, that the series would air on Netflix with a two-season order, where all thirteen episodes of the first season premiered on March 6, 2015.
Welcome to Sweden—Canceled on July 28, 2015 after two seasons.

See also
2014–15 United States network television schedule (daytime)
2014–15 United States network television schedule (late night)

References

United States primetime network television schedules
2014 in American television
2015 in American television